Vida (Life) is the debut album of Argentine rock group Sui Generis, released in 1972 by Microfón. 

In 2007, the Argentine edition of Rolling Stone ranked it 66th on its list of "The 100 Greatest Albums of Argentine Rock".

Background
Sui Generis was an electric band formed at the Instituto Social Militar Dr. Dámaso Centeno under the influence of the Swinging London and the regulars of La Cueva. 
The project soon became an acoustic duo. And, during a tour of Mar del Plata, they were signed by Jorge Álvarez for the Talent Microfón label. Very soon Álvarez (founder of Mandioca) managed to incorporate Sui Generis into the grid of the third "B.A. Rock" festival and secure their inclusion in the subsequent movie Hasta que se ponga el sol. 
In a period dominated by explosive bands like Color Humano or Pescado Rabioso, acoustic songs were a risky bet. 
The duo's first live performance was documented in the film.

Vida features a structure of progressive folk tunes, with a backing band of musicians from Manal and Billy Bond y la Pesada.

Track listing
Side One

Side Two

Personnel
Sui Generis:
 Charly García — piano, guitar, vocals
 Nito Mestre — guitar, flute, vocals

Additional Musicians:
 Jorge Pinchevsky — violin
 Claudio Gabis — guitar
 Alejandro Medina — bass
 Francisco Pratti — drums

References

1972 debut albums
Spanish-language albums